Talesh Kandi (also Romanized as Ţālesh Kandī) is a village in Charuymaq-e Shomalesharqi Rural District, in the Central District of Hashtrud County, East Azerbaijan Province, Iran. At the 2006 census, its population was 87, in 24 families.

References 

Towns and villages in Hashtrud County